A passport is an official travel document issued by a government that contains a person's identity. A person with a passport can travel to and from foreign countries more easily and access consular assistance. A passport certifies the personal identity and nationality of its holder. It is typical for passports to contain the full name, photograph, place and date of birth, signature, and the expiration date of the passport. While passports are typically issued by national governments, certain subnational governments are authorised to issue passports to citizens residing within their borders.

Many nations issue (or plan to issue) biometric passports that contain an embedded microchip, making them machine-readable and difficult to counterfeit. , there were over 150 jurisdictions issuing e-passports. Previously issued non-biometric machine-readable passports usually remain valid until their respective expiration dates.

A passport holder is normally entitled to enter the country that issued the passport, though some people entitled to a passport may not be full citizens with right of abode (e.g. American nationals or British nationals). A passport does not of itself create any rights in the country being visited or obligate the issuing country in any way, such as providing consular assistance. Some passports attest to the bearer having a status as a diplomat or other official, entitled to rights and privileges such as immunity from arrest or prosecution.

History
One of the earliest known references to paperwork that served in a role similar to that of a passport is found in the Hebrew Bible. Nehemiah 2:7–9, dating from approximately 450 BC, states that Nehemiah, an official serving King Artaxerxes I of Persia, asked permission to travel to Judea; the king granted leave and gave him a letter "to the governors beyond the river" requesting safe passage for him as he traveled through their lands.

The Arthashastra make mentions of passes issued at the rate of one masha per pass to enter and exit the country. Chapter 34 of the Second Book of Arthashastra concerns with the duties of the  who must issue sealed passes before a person could enter or leave the countryside.

Passports were an important part of the Chinese bureaucracy as early as the Western Han (202 BC – 9 AD), if not in the Qin Dynasty. They required such details as age, height, and bodily features. These passports (zhuan) determined a person's ability to move throughout imperial counties and through points of control. Even children needed passports, but those of one year or less who were in their mother's care may not have needed them.

In the medieval Islamic Caliphate, a form of passport was the bara'a, a receipt for taxes paid. Only people who paid their zakah (for Muslims) or jizya (for dhimmis) taxes were permitted to travel to different regions of the Caliphate; thus, the bara'a receipt was a "basic passport."

Etymological sources show that the term "passport" is from a medieval italian document that was required in order to pass through the harbors customs (Italian "passa porto", to pass the harbor) or through the gate (Italian "passa porte", to pass the gates) of a city wall or a city territory. In medieval Europe, such documents were issued by local authorities to foreign travellers (as opposed to local citizens, as is the modern practice) and generally contained a list of towns and cities the document holder was permitted to enter or pass through. On the whole, documents were not required for travel to sea ports, which were considered open trading points, but documents were required to pass harbor controls and travel inland from sea ports. The transition from private to state control over movement was an essential aspect of the transition from feudalism to capitalism. Communal obligations to provide poor relief were an important source of the desire for controls on movement.:10

In the 12th century, the Republic of Genoa issued a document called Bulletta, which was issued to the nationals of the Republic who were traveling to the ports of the emporiums and the ports of the Genoese colonies overseas, as well as to foreigners who entered them.

King Henry V of England is credited with having invented what some consider the first British passport in the modern sense, as a means of helping his subjects prove who they were in foreign lands. The earliest reference to these documents is found in a 1414 Act of Parliament. In 1540, granting travel documents in England became a role of the Privy Council of England, and it was around this time that the term "passport" was used. In 1794, issuing British passports became the job of the Office of the Secretary of State. The 1548 Imperial Diet of Augsburg required the public to hold imperial documents for travel, at the risk of permanent exile.

In 1791, Louis XVI masqueraded as a valet during his Flight to Varennes as passports for the nobility typically included a number of persons listed by their function but without further description.:31–32

A Pass-Card Treaty of October 18, 1850 among German states standardized information including issuing state, name, status, residence, and description of bearer. Tramping journeymen and jobseekers of all kinds were not to receive pass-cards.:92–93

A rapid expansion of railway infrastructure and wealth in Europe beginning in the mid-nineteenth century led to large increases in the volume of international travel and a consequent unique dilution of the passport system for approximately thirty years prior to World War I. The speed of trains, as well as the number of passengers that crossed multiple borders, made enforcement of passport laws difficult. The general reaction was the relaxation of passport requirements. In the later part of the nineteenth century and up to World War I, passports were not required, on the whole, for travel within Europe, and crossing a border was a relatively straightforward procedure.  Consequently, comparatively few people held passports.

During World War I, European governments introduced border passport requirements for security reasons, and to control the emigration of people with useful skills. These controls remained in place after the war, becoming a standard, though controversial, procedure. British tourists of the 1920s complained, especially about attached photographs and physical descriptions, which they considered led to a "nasty dehumanisation". The British Nationality and Status of Aliens Act was passed in 1914, clearly defining the notions of citizenship and creating a booklet form of the passport.

In 1920, the League of Nations held a conference on passports, the Paris Conference on Passports & Customs Formalities and Through Tickets. Passport guidelines and a general booklet design resulted from the conference, which was followed up by conferences in 1926 and 1927. The League of Nations issued Nansen passports to stateless refugees from 1922 to 1938.

While the United Nations held a travel conference in 1963, no passport guidelines resulted from it. Passport standardization came about in 1980, under the auspices of the ICAO. ICAO standards include those for machine-readable passports. Such passports have an area where some of the information otherwise written in textual form is written as strings of alphanumeric characters, printed in a manner suitable for optical character recognition. This enables border controllers and other law enforcement agents to process these passports more quickly, without having to input the information manually into a computer. ICAO publishes Doc 9303 Machine Readable Travel Documents, the technical standard for machine-readable passports. A more recent standard is for biometric passports. These contain biometrics to authenticate the identity of travellers. The passport's critical information is stored on a tiny RFID computer chip, much like information stored on smartcards. Like some smartcards, the passport booklet design calls for an embedded contactless chip that is able to hold digital signature data to ensure the integrity of the passport and the biometric data.

Historically, legal authority to issue passports is founded on the exercise of each country's executive discretion. Certain legal tenets follow, namely: first, passports are issued in the name of the state; second, no person has a legal right to be issued a passport; third, each country's government, in exercising its executive discretion, has complete and unfettered discretion to refuse to issue or to revoke a passport; and fourth, that the latter discretion is not subject to judicial review.  However, legal scholars including A.J. Arkelian have argued that evolutions in both the constitutional law of democratic countries and the international law applicable to all countries now render those historical tenets both obsolete and unlawful.

Types
Governments around the world issue a variety of passports for different purposes. The most common variety are ordinary passports issued to individual citizens and other nationals. In the past, certain countries issued collective passports or family passports. Today, passports are typically issued to individual travellers rather than groups. Aside from ordinary passports issued to citizens by national governments, there are a variety of other types of passports by governments in specific circumstances.

While individuals are typically only permitted to hold one passport, certain governments permit citizens to hold more than one ordinary passport. Individuals may also simultaneously hold an ordinary passport and an official or diplomatic passport.

Emergency passport 

Emergency passports (also called temporary passports) are issued to persons whose passports were lost, stolen or do not have at all and they have no time to obtain a replacement, e.g. someone abroad and needing to fly home within a few days. These passports are intended for very short time durations, e.g. one way travel back to the home country, and will naturally have much shorter validity periods than regular passports. Laissez-passer are also used for this purpose. Uniquely, the United Kingdom issues emergency passports to citizens of certain Commonwealth states who lose their passports in non-Commonwealth countries where their home state does not maintain a diplomatic or consular mission.

Diplomatic and official passports

Pursuant to the Vienna Convention on Diplomatic Relations, Vienna Convention on Consular Relations, and the immunity afforded to officials of a foreign state under customary international law, diplomats and other individuals travelling on government business are entitled to reduced scrutiny at border checkpoints when travelling overseas. Consequently, such individuals are typically issued special passports indicating their status. These passports come in three distinct varieties:

 Diplomatic passports Typically issued to accredited diplomats, senior consular staff, heads of state or government, and to senior foreign ministry employees. Individuals holding diplomatic passports are entitled to the greatest degree of immunity from border control inspections.
 Official (or service) passports Issued to senior government officials travelling on state business who are not eligible for diplomatic passports. Holders of official passports are typically entitled to similar immunity from border control inspections. In the United States of America, official and service passports are two distinct categories of passport, with official passports being issued to senior government officials while service passports are issued to government contractors.
 Public affairs passports Issued to Chinese nationals holding senior positions in state-owned companies. While public affairs passports do not usually entitle their bearers to exemption from searches at border checkpoints, they are subject to more liberal visa policies in several countries primarily in Africa and Asia (see: Visa requirements for Chinese citizens).

Passports without right of abode

Unlike most countries, the United Kingdom and the Republic of China issue various categories of passports to individuals without the right of abode in their territory. In the United Kingdom's case, these passports are typically issued to individuals connected with a former British colony while, in the ROC's case, these passports are the result of the legal distinction between ROC nationals with and without residence in the area it administers. In both cases, holders of such passports are able to obtain residence on an equal footing with foreigners by applying for indefinite leave to remain (UK) or a resident certificate (ROC).

A Republic of China citizen who does not have household registration in the area administered by the ROC  is classified as a National Without Household Registration (NWOHR) and is subject to immigration controls when clearing ROC border controls, does not have automatic residence rights, and cannot vote in Taiwanese elections. However, they are exempt from conscription. Most individuals with this status are children born overseas to ROC citizens who do hold household registration. Additionally, because the ROC observes the principle of jus sanguinis, members of the overseas Chinese community are also regarded as citizens. During the Cold War, both the ROC and PRC governments actively sought the support of overseas Chinese communities in their attempts to secure the position as the legitimate sole government of China. The ROC also encouraged overseas Chinese businessmen to settle in Taiwan to facilitate economic development and regulations concerning evidence of ROC nationality by descent were particularly lax during the period, allowing many overseas Chinese the right to settle in Taiwan. About 60,000 NWOHRs currently hold Taiwanese passports with this status.

The United Kingdom issues several distinct categories of passports that do not grant bearers right of abode. British National (Overseas) passports are issued to individuals connected to Hong Kong prior to its return to China, British Overseas Citizen passports are primarily issued to individuals who did not acquire the citizenship of the colony they were connected to when it obtained independence (or their stateless descendants), British Protected Person passports are issued to otherwise stateless people connected to a former British protectorate, and British subject passports are issued to otherwise stateless individuals connected to British India or to certain categories of Irish citizens (though, in the latter case, they do convey right of abode). British Overseas Citizen passports are also issued to certain categories of Malaysian nationals of Chinese origin and individuals connected to Cyprus as a result of the legislation granting independence to those former British colonies.

Border control policies in many jurisdictions distinguish between holders of passports with and without right of abode, including NWOHRs and holders of the various British passports the do not confer right of abode upon the bearer. Certain jurisdictions may additionally distinguish between holders of such British passports with and without indefinite leave to remain in the United Kingdom. NWOHRs do not, for instance, have access to the Visa Waiver Program, or to visa free access to the Schengen Area or Japan. Other countries, such as India which allows all Chinese nationals to apply for eVisas, don't make such a distinction. Notably, while Singapore does permit visa free entry to all categories of British passport holders, it reduces length of stay for British nationals without right of abode in the United Kingdom, but does not distinguish between ROC passport holders with and without household registration.

Until 31 January 2021, holders of British National (Overseas) passports were able to use their UK passports for immigration clearance in Hong Kong and to seek consular protection from overseas Chinese diplomatic missions. This was a unique arrangement as it involved a passport issued by one state conferring right of abode (or, more precisely right to land) in and consular protection from another state. Since that date, the Chinese and Hong Kong governments have prohibited the use of BN(O) passports as travel documents or proof of identity and it; much like British Overseas Citizen, British Protected Person, or ROC NWOHR passports; is not associated with right of abode in any territory. BN(O)s who do not possess Chinese (or any other) nationality are required to use a Document of Identity for Visa Purposes for travel. This restriction disproportionally affects ease of travel for permanent residents of Indian, Pakistani, and Nepali ethnicity, who were not granted Chinese nationality in 1997. As an additional consequence, Hongkongers seeking early pre-retirement withdrawals from the Mandatory Provident Fund pension scheme may not use BN(O) passports for identity verification.

Additionally, individuals connected to a British overseas territory are accorded British Overseas Territories citizenship, which in and of itself confers right of abode in no country or territory. Each territory maintains its own criteria for determining whom it grants right of abode. Consequently, individuals holding BOTC passports are not necessarily entitled to enter or reside in the territory that issued their passport. Most countries distinguish between BOTC and other classes of British nationality for border control purposes. For instance, only Bermudian passport holders with an endorsement stating that they possess right of abode or belonger status in Bermuda are entitled to enter America without an electronic travel authorisation.

Similarly, non-citizens in Latvia and in Estonia are individuals, primarily of Russian or Ukrainian ethnicity, who are not citizens of Latvia or Estonia but whose families have resided in the area since the Soviet era, and thus have the right to a special non-citizen passport issued by the government as well as some other specific rights. Approximately two thirds of them are ethnic Russians, followed by ethnic Belarusians, ethnic Ukrainians, ethnic Poles and ethnic Lithuanians. This form of legal discrimination has been labelled as xenophobic by the UN Special Rapporteur. Per Russian visa policy, holders of the Estonian alien's passport or the Latvian non-citizen passport are entitled to visa free entry to Russia, in contrast to Estonian and Latvian citizens who must obtain an electronic visa.

Andorran provisional passports 
Children born in Andorra to foreign residents who have not yet resided in the country for a minimum of 10 years are provided a provisional passport. Once the child reaches 18 years old he or she must confirm their nationality to the Government.

Regional and subnational passports

China
The People's Republic of China (PRC) authorises its Special Administrative Regions of Hong Kong and Macau to issue passports to their permanent residents with Chinese nationality under the "one country, two systems" arrangement. Visa policies imposed by foreign authorities on Hong Kong and Macau permanent residents holding such passports are different from those holding ordinary passports of the People's Republic of China. A Hong Kong Special Administrative Region passport (HKSAR passport) permits visa-free access to many more countries than ordinary PRC passports.

Kingdom of Denmark
The three constituent countries of the Danish Realm have a common nationality. Denmark proper is a member of the European Union, but Greenland and Faroe Islands are not. Danish citizens residing in Greenland or Faroe Islands can choose between holding a Danish EU passport and a Greenlandic or Faroese non-EU Danish passport.

Serbian Coordination Directorate Passports in Kosovo

Under Serbian law, people born or otherwise legally settled in Kosovo are considered Serbian nationals and as such they are entitled to a Serbian passport. However, these passports are not issued by the Serbian Ministry of the Interior. Instead they are issued by the Serbian Coordination Directorate. These particular passports do not allow the holder to enter the Schengen Area without a visa.

American Samoa

Although all American citizens are also American nationals, the reverse is not true. This was formerly the case in a few other current or former U.S. overseas possessions, i.e. the Panama Canal Zone and Trust Territory of the Pacific Islands. The American passport issued to non-citizen nationals contains the endorsement code 9 which states: "THE BEARER IS A UNITED STATES NATIONAL AND NOT A UNITED STATES CITIZEN." on the annotations page. Non-citizen nationals may reside and work in America without restrictions, and may apply for citizenship under the same rules as resident aliens. Like resident aliens, they are not presently allowed by any U.S. state to vote in federal or state elections.

Passports issued by entities without sovereign territory

Several entities without a sovereign territory issue documents described as passports, most notably Iroquois League, the Aboriginal Provisional Government in Australia and the Sovereign Military Order of Malta. Such documents are not necessarily accepted for entry into a country.

Details and specifications

Criteria for issuance
Each country sets its own conditions for the issue of passports. Under the law of most countries, passports are government property, and may be limited or revoked at any time, usually on specified grounds, and possibly subject to judicial review. In many countries, surrender of one's passport is a condition of granting bail in lieu of imprisonment for a pending criminal trial due to the risk of the person leaving the country. When passport holders apply for a new passport (commonly, due to expiration of the previous passport, insufficient validity for entry to some countries or lack of blank pages), they may be required to surrender the old passport for invalidation. In some circumstances an expired passport is not required to be surrendered or invalidated (for example, if it contains an unexpired visa).

Requirements for passport applicants vary significantly from country to country, with some states imposing stricter measures than others. For example, Pakistan requires applicants to be interviewed before a Pakistani passport will be granted. When applying for a passport or a national ID card, all Pakistanis are required to sign an oath declaring Mirza Ghulam Ahmad to be an impostor prophet and all Ahmadis to be non-Muslims. In contrast, individuals holding British National (Overseas) status are legally entitled to hold a passport in that capacity.

Countries with conscription or national service requirements may impose restrictions on passport applicants who have not yet completed their military obligations. For example, in Finland, male citizens aged 18–30 years must prove that they have completed, or are exempt from, their obligatory military service to be granted an unrestricted passport; otherwise a passport is issued valid only until the end of their 28th year, to ensure that they return to carry out military service. Other countries with obligatory military service, such as South Korea and Syria, have similar requirements, e.g. South Korean passport and Syrian passport.

Validity

Passports have a limited validity, usually between 5 and 10 years.

Many countries require passports to be valid for a minimum of six months beyond the planned date of departure, as well as having at least two to four blank pages. It is recommended that a passport be valid for at least six months from the departure date as many airlines deny boarding to passengers whose passport has a shorter expiry date, even if the destination country does not have such a requirement for incoming visitors.

Cover designs

Passport booklets from almost all countries around the world display the national coat of arms of the issuing country on the front cover. The United Nations keeps a record of national coats of arms, but displaying a coat of arms is not an internationally recognised requirement for a passport.

There are several groups of countries that have, by mutual agreement, adopted common designs for their passports:

 The European Union. The design and layout of passports of the member states of the European Union are a result of consensus and recommendation, rather than of directive.  Passports are issued by member states and may consist of either the usual passport booklet or the newer passport card format. The covers of ordinary passport booklets are burgundy-red (except for Croatia which has a blue cover), with "European Union" written in the national language or languages. Below that are the name of the country, the national coat of arms, the word or words for "passport", and, at the bottom, the symbol for a biometric passport. The data page can be at the front or at the back of a passport booklet and there are significant design differences throughout to indicate which member state is the issuer. Member states that participate in the Schengen Agreement have agreed that their e-passports should contain fingerprint information in the chip.
 In 2006, the members of the CA-4 Treaty (Guatemala, El Salvador, Honduras, and Nicaragua) adopted a common-design passport, called the Central American passport, following a design already in use by Nicaragua and El Salvador since the mid-1990s. It features a navy-blue cover with the words "América Central" and a map of Central America, and with the territory of the issuing country highlighted in gold (in place of the individual nations' coats of arms). At the bottom of the cover are the name of the issuing country and the passport type.
 The members of the Andean Community of Nations (Bolivia, Colombia, Ecuador, and Peru) began to issue commonly designed passports in 2005. Specifications for the common passport format were outlined in an Andean Council of Foreign Ministers meeting in 2002.  Previously issued national passports will be valid until their expiry dates. Andean passports are bordeaux (burgundy-red), with words in gold. Centred above the national seal of the issuing country is the name of the regional body in Spanish (Comunidad Andina). Below the seal is the official name of the member country. At the bottom of the cover is the Spanish word "pasaporte" along with the English "passport". Venezuela had issued Andean passports, but has subsequently left the Andean Community, so they will no longer issue Andean passports.
 The Union of South American Nations had signaled an intention to establish a common passport design, but it is doubtful that this will happen since the group effectively broke up in 2019.
 Twelve member states of the Caribbean Community (CARICOM) began issuing passports with a common design since early 2009. It features the CARICOM symbol along with the national coat of arms and name of the member state, rendered in a CARICOM official language (English, French, Dutch). The member states which use the common design are Antigua and Barbuda, Barbados, Belize, Dominica, Grenada, Guyana, Jamaica, Saint Kitts and Nevis, Saint Lucia, Saint Vincent and the Grenadines, Suriname, and Trinidad and Tobago.  There was a movement by the Organisation of Eastern Caribbean States (OECS) to issue a common designed passport, but the implementation of the CARICOM passport made that redundant, and it was abandoned.

Request page

Passports sometimes contain a message, usually near the front, requesting that the passport's bearer be allowed to pass freely, and further requesting that, in the event of need, the bearer be granted assistance. The message is sometimes made in the name of the government or the head of state, and may be written in more than one language, depending on the language policies of the issuing authority.

Languages

In 1920, an international conference on passports and through tickets held by the League of Nations recommended that passports be issued in the French language, historically the language of diplomacy, and one other language. Currently, the ICAO recommends that passports be issued in English, French and Spanish, or in the national language of the issuing country and in either English, French or Spanish. Many European countries use their national language, along with English and French.

Some additional language combinations are:
 National passports of the European Union bear all of the official languages of the European Union. Two or three languages are printed at the relevant points, followed by reference numbers which point to the passport page where translations into the remaining languages appear.
 The Barbadian passport and the United States passport are tri-lingual: English, French and Spanish. United States passports were English and French since 1976, but began being printed with a Spanish message and labels during the late 1990s, in recognition of Puerto Rico's Spanish-speaking status. Since 2007, the Data Page, which contains photo, identifying information, and the passport's issuance and expiration dates, and the Personal Data and Emergency Contact page are written in English, French, and Spanish; the cover and instructions pages are printed solely in English.
 
 On Belgian passports, all three official languages (Dutch, French, German) appear on the cover, in addition to English on the main page. The order of the official languages depends on the official residence of the holder.
 Passports of Bosnia and Herzegovina are in the three official languages of Bosnian, Serbian and Croatian in addition to English.
 Brazilian passports contain four languages: Portuguese, the official country language, Spanish, because of bordering nations, English and French.
 British passports bear English and French on the information page and Welsh and Scottish Gaelic translations on an extra page.
 Cypriot passports are in Greek, Turkish and English.
 Haitian passports are in French and Haitian Creole.
 Passports issued by the Holy See are in Latin (the language of the Catholic Church), French, and English.
 The first page of old Libyan passport (green cover) was in Arabic only. The current passport has dark-blue cover is electronically readable and has Arabic with English translation in the first page (first page from a right-to-lift script viewpoint). Similar arrangements are found in the passports of some other Arab countries.
 Iraqi passports are in Arabic, Kurdish and English.
 Lebanese Passports are in three languages: Arabic, English, and French.
 Macau SAR passports are in three languages: Chinese (in Traditional Chinese characters), Portuguese and English.
New Zealand passports are in English and te reo Māori.
 Norwegian passports are in the two forms of the Norwegian language, Bokmål and Nynorsk, Northern Sami and English.
 Sri Lankan passports are in Sinhala, Tamil and English.
 Swiss passports are in five languages: German, French, Italian, Romansh and English. Page 2 and 3 contains translations into 26 languages.
 Syrian passports are in Arabic, English, and French.

Limitations on use

A passport is merely an identity document that is widely recognised for international travel purposes, and the possession of a passport does not in itself entitle a traveller to enter any country other than the country that issued it, and sometimes not even then. Many countries normally require visitors to obtain a visa. Each country has different requirements or conditions for the grant of visas, such as for the visitor not being likely to become a public charge for financial, health, family, or other reasons, and the holder not having been convicted of a crime or considered likely to commit one. Where a country does not recognise another, or is in dispute with it, entry may be prohibited to holders of passports of the other party to the dispute, and sometimes to others who have, for example, visited the other country; examples are listed below. A country that issues a passport may also restrict its validity or use in specified circumstances, such as use for travel to certain countries for political, security, or health reasons.

Many nations implement border controls restricting the entry of people of certain nationalities or who have visited certain countries. For instance Georgia refuses entry to holders of passports issued by the Republic of China. Similarly, since April 2017, nationals of Bangladesh, Pakistan, Sudan, Syria, Yemen, and Iran have been banned from entering the parts of eastern Libya under the control of the Tobruk government. The Pakistani passports explicitly mention that these passports are valid in all countries except Israel. The majority of Arab countries, as well as Iran and Malaysia, ban Israeli citizens, however exceptional entry to Malaysia is possible with approval from the Ministry of Home Affairs. Certain countries may also restrict entry to those with Israeli stamps or visas in their passports. As a result of tension over the Artsakh dispute, Azerbaijan currently forbids entry to Armenian citizens as well as to individuals with proof of travel to Artsakh.

Between September 2017 and January 2021, The United States of America did not issue new visas to nationals of Iran, North Korea, Libya, Somalia, Syria, or Yemen pursuant to restrictions imposed by the Trump administration, which were subsequently repealed by the Biden administration on 20 January 2021. While in force, the restrictions were conditional and could be lifted if the countries affected meet the required security standards specified by the Trump administration, and dual citizens of these countries could still enter if they presented a passport from a non-designated country.

Value
One method by which to rank the value of a passport is to calculate its mobility score (MS). The mobility score of a passport is the number of countries that allow the holder of that passport to enter for general tourism visa-free, visa-on-arrival, eTA, or eVisa issued within 3 days.  the strongest and weakest passports are as follows:

Passport issuance volumes

See also

Animal passport
Identity document
Identity theft
List of passports
Passport stamp
Pet passport
Self-sovereign identity
Travel document

Notes

References

Further reading

External links

PRADO – The Council of the European Union Public Register of Authentic Travel- and ID Documents Online
How Passports Work US-focused information from Howstuffworks
Investigation into passport fraud, Dateline NBC, December 28, 2007
Passport-free travel to begin for citizens of nine more European countries, Seattle Times, November 8, 2007